Høstmørke is the Norwegian black metal band Isengard's second album which was released in 1995. The title 'Høstmørke' means "Autumn Darkness" in Norwegian.

Track listing
 "Neslepaks" (When read backwards it becomes "Skapelsen" which means "The Creation") – 5:32
 "Landet og Havet" (The Land and the Sea) – 1:07
 "I Kamp med Hvitekrist" (In Battle With Christ) – 4:57
 "I ei Gran Borti Nordre Åsen" (In a spruce far into the Northern Ridge) – 3:43
 "Over de Syngende Øde Moer" (Over the Singing Wastelands) – 5:52
 "Thornspawn Chalice" – 8:10
 "Total Death" – 2:50

Credits
Fenriz – all instruments and vocals

Guests
Aldrahn (Dødheimsgard) – spoken vocals on track 1
Vicotnik (Dødheimsgard) – first scream on track 6

Reception
Peaceville records took up what they described as a classic album for a re-release on their label.

Sonic Abuse describe Høstmørke as "a stunning, icy collection of folk, doom, black metal and rock all held together by the charismatic strength of Fenriz’s idiosyncratic voice and the sheer wealth of influences that can be found throughout the disc", and praise Peaceville for the "more than worthy" reissue.

References

1995 albums
Isengard (band) albums